Collingsworth County is a county in the U.S. state of Texas. As of the 2020 census, its population was 2,652. Its county seat is Wellington. The county was created in 1876 and later organized in 1890. It is named for James Collinsworth, a signer of the Texas Declaration of Independence and first chief justice of the Republic of Texas (a recording error in the bill accounts for the error in spelling, which was never corrected). Collingsworth County was one of 30 prohibition, or entirely dry, counties in Texas, but a vote in 2017 changed this law.

History
The county was created in 1876 from the Bexar and Young land district of Texas. Collingsworth County was organized in 1890 with Wellington as the county seat. From 1883 until 1896 the county was home to the English owned Rocking Chair Ranche.

Geography

Major highways
  U.S. Highway 83
  State Highway 203

Adjacent counties
 Wheeler County (north)
 Beckham County, Oklahoma (northeast)
 Harmon County, Oklahoma (southeast)
 Childress County (south)
 Hall County (southwest)
 Donley County (west)
 Gray County (northwest)

Demographics

Note: the US Census treats Hispanic/Latino as an ethnic category. This table excludes Latinos from the racial categories and assigns them to a separate category. Hispanics/Latinos can be of any race.

As of the census of 2000, there were 3,206 people, 1,294 households, and 916 families residing in the county. The racial makeup of the county was 79.82% White, 5.33% Black or African American, 1.62% Native American, 0.19% Asian, 10.89% from other races, and 2.15% from two or more races. 20.43% of the population were Hispanic or Latino of any race.

There were 1,294 households, out of which 29.80% had children under the age of 18 living with them, 57.50% were married couples living together, 9.80% had a female householder with no husband present, and 29.20% were non-families. 27.80% of all households were made up of individuals, and 17.50% had someone living alone who was 65 years of age or older. The average household size was 2.44 and the average family size was 2.97.

In the county, the population was spread out, with 26.40% under the age of 18, 6.60% from 18 to 24, 22.60% from 25 to 44, 22.50% from 45 to 64, and 22.00% who were 65 years of age or older. The median age was 41 years. For every 100 females there were 93.00 males. For every 100 females age 18 and over, there were 88.00 males.

The median income for a household in the county was $25,438, and the median income for a family was $33,323. Males had a median income of $24,808 versus $17,679 for females. The per capita income for the county was $15,318. About 14.80% of families and 18.70% of the population were below the poverty line, including 27.20% of those under age 18 and 16.40% of those age 65 or over.

Communities

City
 Wellington (county seat)

Town
 Dodson

Unincorporated community
 Aberdeen
 Samnorwood

Census-designated places
 Quail CDP
 Samnorwood CDP

Politics
Republican Drew Springer Jr., a businessman from Muenster in Cooke County, has since January 2013 represented Collingsworth County in the Texas House of Representatives.

See also

 List of museums in the Texas Panhandle
 National Register of Historic Places listings in Collingsworth County, Texas
 Recorded Texas Historic Landmarks in Collingsworth County

References

External links
 Collingsworth Public Library
 Collingsworth County Sheriff's Department
 Collingsworth County in Handbook of Texas Online at the University of Texas
 Collingsworth County Homepage

 
1890 establishments in Texas
Populated places established in 1890
Texas Panhandle